The Sheriff of Lauderdale was historically the royal official responsible for enforcing law and order in Lauderdale, Scotland.

Sheriffs of Lauderdale

 Aelsi de Clephane (1170)
 Henry St Clair of Herdmanston (1189)
 Alan de Clephane (1202)

References
Taylor, Alice; The Shape of the State in Medieval Scotland, 1124-1290 (2016).

Sheriff courts
Berwickshire